Guy Marcoux (21 February 1924 – 23 September 2011) was a Social Credit party member of the House of Commons of Canada. He was a physician by career.

He was first elected at the Québec—Montmorency riding in the 1962 general election then re-elected in 1963. Marcoux became an independent candidate in the 1965 election with Henri Borgia as the Ralliement créditiste candidate. However, Marcoux was defeated at Québec—Montmorency by Ovide Laflamme of the Liberal party.

Archives 
There is a Guy Marcoux fonds at Library and Archives Canada. Archival reference number is R7131.

References

External links
 

1924 births
2011 deaths
Physicians from Quebec
Politicians from Quebec City
Members of the House of Commons of Canada from Quebec
Independent MPs in the Canadian House of Commons
Social Credit Party of Canada MPs